The BYD F0, formerly known as BYD F1, is a city car produced by the Chinese manufacturer BYD.  It was introduced in July 2008 and was produced up to 2015. Although petrol versions ended, a subsequent electric version, branded under the new "e series" was launched in 2019 as the BYD e1.  

It was marketed as "Really Wonderful". It was unveiled at the 2007 Guangzhou motor show.

Specifications
This engine can accelerate the car from 0 to 100 km/h(62 mph) in 12.80 seconds. The design is an unlicensed copy of the European Toyota Aygo.

Safety

The Chinese-made F0 in its most basic Latin American configuration with no airbags, no ABS and no ESC received 0 stars for adult occupants and 1 star for toddlers from Latin NCAP in 2016.

BYD e1
The BYD e1 is the electric version of the BYD F0. The BYD e1 was introduced in 2019 featuring a front positioned 45 kW and 110N-m electric motor powering the front wheels.

References

External links
 
 

F0
City cars
Hatchbacks
Latin NCAP superminis
Cars introduced in 2008
2010s cars
Cars of China
Production electric cars